John G. Wickser (1856 – 1928) Buffalo, Erie County, New York) was an American businessman and politician.

Life
He was a nephew of Mayor of Buffalo Philip Becker. He was President of the Buffalo German Insurance Company and the Buffalo Commercial Insurance Company.

As a Republican, he was New York State Treasurer from 1903 to 1904, elected at the New York state election, 1902. As Treasurer, he was a member of the Board of Parole which in 1904 denied number racketeer Albert J. Adams's application for parole.

He was a presidential elector in 1908.

References

Sources
History of Germans in Buffalo
 His nomination at the Rep. state convention, in NYT on September 25, 1902
 The Republican nominees, in NYT on September 25, 1902
 His appointments for Treasury officers, in NYT on December 28, 1902
 Parole denied, in NYT on April 6, 1904
 Calling on Nathan Lewis Miller, in NYT on December 12, 1920
1928 Death notice transcribed from the Brooklyn Standard Union on July 3, 1928; at Brooklyn Genealogy

1850s births
1928 deaths
Burials at Forest Lawn Cemetery (Buffalo)
New York State Treasurers
Businesspeople from Buffalo, New York
New York (state) Republicans
Politicians from Buffalo, New York
1908 United States presidential electors